Viktor Karl Konrad Wilhelm von Wahl (Viktor Vil’gel’movich Val’; 1840 – 1915) was a Baltic German general, mayor of St. Petersburg, and governor of Vilnius. He came from Baltic German noble Wahl family, which was a branch of the Scottish MacDowall clan. Von Wahl had also been a director of the Kseniinsky Institute, an exclusive school for aristocratic women.

Von Wahl became the governor of Vilna in the autumn of 1901. In 1902, he ordered the arrest and flogging of a number of Jewish and Polish workers who had taken part in a May Day parade. That same year, a Bundist worker, Hirsh Lekert, unsuccessfully attempted to assassinate him, wounding him in the leg and arm. Lekert was tried by military court, sentenced to death and executed.

Von Wahl became a member of the State Council in 1903, and held the title of "Assistant Minister of the Interior and Commander of the Gendarme Corps." after 1902.

He was awarded the Order of Prince Danilo I and a number of other decorations.

Notes

References
 V.I. Gurko. Features and Figures of the Past; Government and Opinion in the Reign of Nicholas II
 Profiles of a Lost World: Memoirs of East European Jewish Life Before World War II; Hirsz Abramowicz, Eva Zeitlin Dobkin, Dina Abramowicz, Jeffrey Shandler, David E. Fishman, Yivo; Institute for Jewish Research; Wayne State University Press; 1999; p. 132
 

1840 births
1915 deaths
People from the Governorate of Livonia
Antisemitism in Lithuania
Baltic-German people
Imperial Russian Army generals
Members of the State Council (Russian Empire)
Russian people of the January Uprising
Chiefs of the Special Corps of Gendarmes
Mayors of places in the Russian Empire